The chapada flycatcher (Guyramemua affine) is a species of bird in the family Tyrannidae, the tyrant flycatchers. It is placed in its own genus, Guyramemua.

Taxonomy
The chapada flycatcher, scientifically known as the Guyramemua Affinis, is a part of the Animalia kingdom, falling under the Chordata phylum as a part of the Aves class. The chapada flycatcher is in the Passeriformes order, which is included in the Tyrannidae family. The chapada flycatcher further falls in the genus Guyramemua. This species was formerly placed in the genus Suiriri. It was moved to its own newly erected genus, Guyramemua, based on a molecular phylogenetic study published in 2017. Another common name for the chapada flycatcher is the chapada suiriri.

Description
The chapada flycatcher is a medium sized bird with a greyish head, olive green back, and a yellow belly. They have white wings, with a darker tail, and their legs are a medium greyish color. Their tail is short and broad, but proportional to their bodies. They eat mainly insects and fruit from the upper branches of the trees, but only fruit when it can find some. 

Male and female chapada flycatchers sound different from one another. The male chirps a loud series of two couplets. When made to sound like the English language it sounds something like "where where, whooz it". The female has more of a loud bubbly rattle, with a variable length. This sounds more like "whur". They usually will chirp this one or two notes at a time. 

These species are known to be neotropical songbirds with specific characteristics when it comes to behavior, their habitat, and ecological traits. Because they have very specific characteristics, it is often hard for them to adapt to the world around them. These characteristics are increasing their likelihood of extinction. 

This species is not often found on the ground or in shrubs. They prey from up in the trees, where they sit in the branches and observe, and search for food. Therefore, they are most commonly found in trees sitting on branches.

Distribution and habitat
The chapada flycatcher is a South American terrestrial species and native resident of south-western Brazil and eastern Bolivia. It is found in the cerrado of south-central Brazil and adjacent far eastern Bolivia. Other places it typically resides are Campo Cerrado and Campo Sujo. More specifically, they are seen in Maranhão, Tocantins, Mato Grosso, Goiás, Mato Grosso do Sul, and in the adjacent parts of eastern Bolivia. Chapada flycatchers are found in closed shrubby areas that have lots of grass dispersed with tall trees. The chapada flycatcher is accustomed to the dry savanna habitat and shrublands. To be more exact, the chapada flycatcher is most accustomed to cerrado areas with upper elevation limits of 750 meters and lower elevation limits of 250 meters. Typically, a generation of chapada flycatchers lasts 3.6 years. They have no recorded movement patterns as they do not participate in migration.

Status and conservation
The first time the chapada flycatcher was included on the IUCN Red List was 2004; at that time, it was considered a species of least concern. By 2009, however, its status had been uplisted to near threatened, as annual surveys in part of its core range showed dramatic declines of more than 30% over an 11-year period. The reasons for the decline are not well understood, but there are some known threats to chapada flycatchers. When it comes to residential and commercial development, housing and urban areas pose threats due to their natural habitat being torn down to build these structures. Agriculturally, annual and perennial non-timber crops create threats for the chapada flycatchers. This includes wood and pulp plantations as well. Livestock farming and ranching also pose a threat to chapada flycatchers as it disrupts their normal habitat and the resources that are found in this habitat. Lastly, fires and fire suppression cause threats towards the chapada flycatcher. Even with a combination of its decreasing population and lengthy threats, there is no action recovery plan nor systematic monitoring scheme in place for the chapada flycatcher.

References

 Chapada Flycatcher. Arthurgrosset.com. Accessed 2009-02-02.

Further reading

External links
Chapada Flycatcher videos on the Internet Bird Collection

Birds of the Cerrado
Birds of the Pantanal
Birds of Brazil
Birds of Bolivia
Birds described in 2001
Taxobox binomials not recognized by IUCN